Zhongke Road is a station on Line 13 of the Shanghai Metro, part of phase three of the line.  Located at Zhongke Road and Jinke Road in Pudong, Shanghai, the station opened with the phases 2 and 3 extensions of Line 13 on 30 December 2018.

Gallery

References 

Railway stations in Shanghai
Shanghai Metro stations in Pudong
Railway stations in China opened in 2018
Line 13, Shanghai Metro